Indisetron (INN; trade name Sinseron) is a drug used for prophylaxis of chemotherapy-induced nausea and vomiting.  It was approved by Japan's Pharmaceuticals and Medical Devices Agency in 2004.

Indisetron exerts its effects as a dual serotonin 5-HT3 and 5-HT4 receptor antagonist.

See also
 Granisetron
 Ondansetron

References

Antiemetics
Indazoles
Amides